Events from the year 1879 in the United Kingdom.

Incumbents
 Monarch – Victoria
 Prime Minister – Benjamin Disraeli (Conservative)
 Parliament – 21st

Events
 1 January – Benjamin Henry Blackwell opens the first Blackwell's bookshop in Oxford.
 8 January – British army occupies Kandahar in Afghanistan.
 11 January – Anglo-Zulu War begins.
 22 January – Zulu troops led by King Cetshwayo massacre British troops at the Battle of Isandlwana. At Rorke's Drift, outnumbered British soldiers drive the attackers away after hours of fighting.
 3 February – Mosley Street in Newcastle upon Tyne becomes the world's first public highway to be lit by the electric incandescent light bulb, invented by Joseph Swan.
 March – the standard design of pillar box reverts to a cylindrical shape (the "anonymous" style cast by Andrew Handyside and Company).
 2 March – murder of Julia Martha Thomas at Richmond upon Thames.
 12 March – Anglo-Zulu War: At the Battle of Intombe, a British force over one-hundred strong is ambushed and destroyed by Zulu forces.
 13 March – marriage of The Duke of Connaught and Strathearn, third son of Queen Victoria, to Princess Louise Marguerite of Prussia.
 28 March – Anglo-Zulu War: British forces suffer a defeat at the Battle of Hlobane.
 29 March – Anglo-Zulu War: Battle of Kambula – British forces defeat 20,000 Zulus.
 3 April – Anglo-Zulu War: British forces successfully lift the two-month Siege of Eshowe.
 12 May – John Henry Newman elevated to Cardinal.
 26 May – Russia and the United Kingdom sign the Treaty of Gandamak establishing an Afghan state.
 June–August – the wettest summer in England and Wales since records began in 1766, and the equal seventh-coolest since the CET series begins in 1659.
 6 June – William Denny and Brothers launch the world's first ocean-going ship to be built of mild steel, the SS Rotomahana, at Dumbarton.
 14 June – Sidney Faithorn Green, an Anglican priest in the Church of England, is tried and convicted for using Ritualist practices.
 4 July – the Anglo-Zulu War effectively ends with British victory at the Battle of Ulundi.
 16 August – Fulham F.C. founded in London as the Fulham St Andrew's Church Sunday School football club.
 19 August – the foundation stone of the fourth Eddystone Lighthouse is laid by The Prince of Wales and The Duke of Edinburgh.
 September – Doncaster Rovers F.C. formed by railway fitter Albert Jenkins.
 18 September – Blackpool Illuminations lit for the first time.
 2 October – William Denny and Brothers launch the world's first transatlantic steamer to be built of mild steel, the SS Buenos Ayrean, at Dumbarton for Liverpool owners. On 1 December she makes her maiden voyage out of Glasgow for South America.
 13 October – first female students admitted to study for degrees at the University of Oxford, at the new Lady Margaret Hall and Somerville Hall and with the Society of Oxford Home-Students.
 17 October – Sunderland A.F.C. is formed as 'Sunderland and District Teachers A.F.C.' in the North East.
 27 October – Liverpool Echo newspaper first published.
 November–March 1880 – probably the longest ever fog in the city's history engulfs London.
 December – the world's first Christmas grotto opens in Lewis's Liverpool department store as 'Christmas Fairyland'.
 15–23 December – Second Anglo-Afghan War: British victory at the Siege of the Sherpur Cantonment.
 28 December – the Tay Bridge Disaster: The central part of the Tay Rail Bridge in Dundee, Scotland collapses in a storm as a train passes over it, killing 78.
 30 December – the comic opera The Pirates of Penzance is first presented in Paignton, Devon in a token performance for U.K. copyright reasons; the world première is given the following day in New York City, the only Gilbert and Sullivan work to have its official debut outside England.

Undated
 Gabardine is invented by Thomas Burberry, founder of the Burberry fashion house in Basingstoke.
 School meals provided for destitute and poorly nourished children in Manchester.

Publications
 Kate Greenaway's first book, with her own colour illustrations, Under the Window: Pictures & Rhymes for Children.
 Silas Hocking's novel Her Benny.
 George Meredith's novel The Egoist.
 Anthony Trollope's last Palliser novel The Duke's Children (serialised in All the Year Round).
 The Boy's Own Paper first published (19 January).

Births
 1 January
 E. M. Forster, novelist (died 1970)
 Ernest Jones, psychoanalyst (died 1958)
 8 January – Charles Bryant, actor and director (died 1948)
 10 January –  Bobby Walker, Scottish footballer (died 1930)
 13 January – William Reid Dick, sculptor (died 1961)
 26 February – Frank Bridge, composer (died 1941)
 5 March – William Beveridge, economist and social reformer (died 1963)
 20 April – Robert Wilson Lynd, essayist and writer (died 1949)
 26 April – Owen Willans Richardson, physicist, Nobel Prize laureate (died 1959)
 29 April – Thomas Beecham, conductor (died 1961)
 19 May – Viscount Waldorf Astor, businessman and politician (died 1952)
 25 May – Max Aitken, 1st Baron Beaverbrook, Canadian-British business tycoon, politician and writer (died 1964)
 30 May – 
Colin Blythe, bowler (cricket) (killed on active service 1917)
Vanessa Bell, painter (died 1961)
 4 June – Mabel Lucie Attwell, illustrator (died 1964)
 6 June – Patrick Abercrombie, town planner (died 1957)
 15 July – Joseph Campbell, poet and lyricist (died 1944)
 1 August – William Percival Crozier, editor of The Manchester Guardian (died 1944)
 7 August – James Peters, black rugby union international (died 1954)
 13 August – John Ireland, composer (died 1962)
 27 September – Cyril Scott, composer and writer (died 1970)
 10 December – E. H. Shepard, artist and book illustrator (died 1976)
 27 December – Sydney Greenstreet, actor (died 1954)

Deaths
 22 January – John Vivian, Liberal MP, member of the Vivian family, 60
 18 February – Rayner Stephens, radical reformer and Methodist minister (born 1805)
 25 February – Charles Peace, criminal (executed) (born 1832)
 3 March
 William Kingdon Clifford, geometer and philosopher (born 1845) 
 William Howitt, historical writer and poet (born 1792)
 Annie Keary, novelist, poet and children's writer (born 1825)
 22 March – Sir John Woodford, general and archaeologist (born 1785)
 23 March – Sir Walter Trevelyan, naturalist and geologist (born 1797)
 8 April – Sir Anthony Panizzi, librarian (born 1797 in Italy)
 21 April – George Hadfield, radical politician (born 1787)
 25 April – Charles Tennyson Turner, poet (born 1808)
 4 May – William Froude, hydrodynamicist (born 1810)
 8 May – Henry Collen, royal miniature portrait painter (born 1797)
 10 May – Robert Thompson Crawshay, ironmaster (born 1817)
 3 June – Frances Ridley Havergal, religious poet (born 1836)
 7 June – William Tilbury Fox, dermatologist (born 1836)
 3 August – Joseph Severn, painter (born 1793)
 10 August – George Long, classical scholar (born 1800)
 20 August – Sir John Shaw-Lebevre, barrister, Whig politician and civil servant (born 1797)
 19 September – Clara Rousby, actress (born 1848)
 23 September – Francis Kilvert, diarist (peritonitis) (born 1840)
 26 September – Sir William Rowan, field marshal (born 1789)
 5 November – James Clerk Maxwell, physicist (born 1831)
 6 December – John Bentinck, 5th Duke of Portland (born 1800)
 11 December – William Thomas (Gwilym Marles), minister and poet (born 1834)
 13 December – William Calcraft, hangman (born 1800)

References

 
Years of the 19th century in the United Kingdom